The American Staffordshire Terrier, also known as the AmStaff is a medium-sized, short-coated American dog breed.

The American Kennel Club (AKC) describes the breed as "confident, smart and good-natured". American Staffordshire Terriers are similar to American Pit Bull Terriers, though the American Pit Bull Terrier is not recognized by the American Kennel Club. The breed was accepted by the AKC in 1936. It should not be confused with the “Staffy” Staffordshire Bull Terrier of the United Kingdom.

History 

Some varieties of bull-and-terrier from the British Isles began to find their way into America as early as 1850. Some dogs became very famous for their dog fighting skills. Already developed as an American dog, such dogs became a new breed, which was recognized by the United Kennel Club (UKC) in February 1898 as the American Pit Bull Terrier. On June 10, 1936, about 50 UKC registered Pit Bull Terrier dogs were accepted for registration in the American Kennel Club (AKC) stud book with a new breed name and a new purpose, belonging to the AKC terrier group. The name Staffordshire Terrier was chosen, with the claim that the ancestors of the breed originally came from Staffordshire, England. The name of the breed was revised on January 1, 1969, to American Staffordshire Terrier to distinguish it from the British Staffordshire Bull Terrier, a separate breed from the Bull-type terrier group, recognized in England in 1935.

The AKC opened the AmStaff Stud Book to UKC dogs a few more times until the 1970s. Since then, only dogs with AKC registration were to be bred together, if the offspring was to be registered. This fact, along with the breed selection based entirely on conformation through decades, has transformed the American Staffordshire Terrier into a different breed, separated from the American Pit Bull Terrier.

The breed's popularity began to decline in the United States following World War II. In 2018, the American Kennel Club ranked the American Staffordshire Terrier as the 85th most popular purebred breed in the United States.

Temperament 
According to the American Kennel Club, these dogs are "smart, confident, good-natured companions. Their courage is proverbial. A responsibly bred, well-socialized AmStaff is a loyal, trustworthy friend to the end."

Description 

According to AKC's published breed standard which was approved June 10, 1936, the "American Staffordshire Terrier should give the impression of great strength for his size, a well put-together dog, muscular, but agile and graceful, keenly alive to his surroundings. He should be stocky, not long-legged or racy in outline. His courage is proverbial." His head should be medium in length with a broad skull, a distinct stop, and pronounced muscles in the cheek. The ears should be set high on their head and can be cropped or uncropped, but the latter is preferred. Height and weight should be in proportion. The nose should always be black. Many coat colors are accepted. However, dogs with liver or black-and-tan coat, and dogs with more than 80% white are discouraged.

Health 
Their life expectancy is generally 12–16 years with good care. The breed may be vulnerable to skin allergies, urinary tract infections (UTI), and autoimmune diseases. Spondylosis and osteoarthritis are common in older dogs. Other notable issues may include congenital heart disease, elbow dysplasia, hip dysplasia, luxating patella, thyroid dysfunction, and cerebellar ataxia.

American Staffordshire Terrier pups should not be weaned before they are 8–10 weeks old.

Breed-specific legislation and restrictions 

Worldwide, the American Staffordshire Terrier has often been included in breed bans that target pit bull–type dogs and/or fighting dog breeds. Such breed-specific legislation (BSL) may range from outright bans on possession to restrictions and conditions of ownership. Breed Specific Legislation has been enacted in various states in the United States, France, Australia, Canada, Ireland, Turkey, and the United Kingdom.

The breed is also commonly listed on breed restriction lists for apartments in the United States.

Popularity

In 2017, the breed was the eighth most popular dog according to the Australian National Kennel Council. According to Société Centrale Canine, it is the sixth most popular dog in France. According to the American Kennel Club, it was the 85th most popular dog in 2020.

See also
 Dogs portal
 List of dog breeds
 Bull Terrier
 Miniature Bull Terrier

References

Further reading 
Listed by year of publication
 Fraser, Jacqueline. The American Staffordshire Terrier, 1990
 Ormsby, Clifford & Alberta. The American Staffordshire Terrier, 1956
 Nicholas, Anna Katherine. Staffordshire Terriers: American Staffordshire Terrier and Staffordshire Bull Terrier, 1991, 256 pages; 
 Foster, Sarah. The American Staffordshire Terrier: Gamester and Guardian, 1998, 139 pages; 
 Linzy, Jan. American Staffordshire Terrier Champions, 1988–1995, 1998, 84 pages; 
 Linzy, Jan. American Staffordshire Terrier Champions, 1996–2001, 2002, 84 pages; 
 Janish, Joseph. American Staffordshire Terrier, 2003, 155 pages; 
 Off the Chain, 2005, Bobby J. Brown; IMDb 0472478.
 Beyond the Myth: A Film About Pit Bulls and Breed Discrimination, 2010, Libby Sherrill; IMDb 1993286

External links 

 Staffordshire Terrier Club of America
 American Staffordshire Terrier at Curlie

Terriers
FCI breeds
Dog breeds originating in the United States